Eastern Uganda campaign may refer to:
 Eastern Uganda campaign of 1979
 Operations in eastern Uganda 1986–1994
 NRA and UNLA offensives of February and March 1986